Chinchakhede is a village in India, Located in the north-west region of the Maharashtra state in Dhule district. Near banks of river 'Kanher'. Agriculture and Animal husbandry is main source of income for the village.
It is located 1,128 km from national capital Delhi, 288 km distance from its State Capital Mumbai & 22 km from district place Dhule.

Administration
'Grampnchayat of Chinchakhede' is playing main role in Chinchakhede's administration.
There are 11 seats in 'Grampnchayat' for 'Grampnchayat Member'.

Demographics
The total population of the village is 3313. In which 1750 are Males and 1563 are Females.

Agriculture
Agriculture is the main business, It includes crop production (farming and contract farming), seed supply, agrichemicals, breeding, farm machinery, distribution, processing, marketing, and retail sales.
There are mainly two season of crop production
1. Khareep (At the starting time of Mansoon season)
2. Rubby (At the start of Winter season)
Following are the few main crop harvest in Chinchkhede
 Cotton
 Bajara
 Wheat
 Chilly
 Corn

Festivals
Diwali, Dussera, Gudhipadwa, Holi, Makarsankranti are the main festivals in the Chinchakhede. The utsav of goodies 'Kanabai/Kanubai' is also celebrated on alternate years

Education

The provision of education is up to 12th class in Chinchkhede.
The Primary education is given by Zila Parishad's School, 'Jeevan Shikshan Vidya Mandir, Chinchkhede'. The Secondary and Higher-Secondary education is given by Gramvikas Shikshan Sanstha's, 'Jai Bhavani Madhyamik Vidyala, Chinchkhede'.
To get the education students are come from other villages around Chinchkhede like Aanchale, Aanchale-Tanda, Aamdad, Savali.

Other villages near by Chinchkhede: Ajang, Anchade, Amdad, Bhirdai (Big), Bhirdai (Small), Kalkhede, Mukati, Savali.

Towns near by Chinchkhede: Amalner, Parola, Shindkhede (41.1 km), Sakri (49.4 km), Shirpur (51.4 km)

See also
 Dhule District
 List of villages in Dhule District
 List of districts of Maharashtra
 Maharashtra

Notes

References 
जिला परीषद,धुळे
For Pincode 424301
Census Of India: 2001: Population for Village Code 00153500
Registration Plate for Vehicle
For City Code 02562
Get Online 7/12
List of Below Poverty Line Families

Villages in Dhule taluka